Dizhuang railway station is a railway station in Dizhuang Town, Xupu County, Huaihua, Hunan. It is on the Zhuzhou–Guiyang railway, part of the Shanghai–Kunming railway. It was built in 1972, and is administered by China Railway Guangzhou Group.

References 

Railway stations in Hunan
Railway stations in Huaihua
Stations on the Shanghai–Kunming Railway